Sensualidad may refer to:

 Sensualidad (film), a 1951 Mexican drama film
 "Sensualidad" (song), a 2017 song by Bad Bunny, Prince Royce, and J Balvin